The Line C is a line on the Frankfurt U-Bahn. It consists of the U6 and the U7.

At the time of the line's inauguration in 1986, it ran from Enkheim to the Hauptwache and then continued along the Bockenheimer Landstrasse all the way up to Bockenheim and then continued to their terminus in Hausen for U7, whereas for U6, it then continued to their terminus in Praunheim.

Sections
Line C consists of various stretches:

Heerstraße – Industriehof
The longer of the two branches of the line is used by the line U6 and is located on the median strip of the usually two-lane Ludwig-Landmann-Straße, which serves as an entry and exit road. The line, on which until 1986 the tram line 22 reversed, was already extended in the 1970s in connection with the construction of the central workshop on the Heerstraße urban railway and road-independent. For the opening of the C route, therefore, hardly any conversion measures were required, only the existing platforms were brought to a uniform length of 90 meters. A further expansion took place only in recent years, the route was thereby equipped with barrier-free elevated platforms and entrances.

The route begins with a three-track turning plant on the Heerstraße at the height of a substation. It is largely surrounded by agricultural fields on which the business park Praunheim is to be built in the future. From there, the one-kilometer connecting section takes you to the Stadtbahn central workshop in Rödelheim, which is about one kilometer away. There, all VGF rail vehicles are serviced. After this junction, the route crosses the orthogonal Heerstraße and merges into the median strip of Ludwig-Landmann-Straße. There is - now about 100 meters away - the same name Stadtbahnstation Heerstraße. It received a high platform in mid-layer in 2004 and was merged with the formerly very close station Ebelfeld and therefore moved to the south. In order to not extend the transfer routes to the bus line 60, which is actually only operated by the Heerstraße, the bus stop was relocated to Ludwig-Landmann-Straße and a turning point was built immediately before the terminus of the U6. The bus stop is currently still in the provisional state, while the light rail station is equipped according to the latest stop design of the VGF. It opens up the settlement of Praunheim, which was built in the 1920s as part of Ernst May's New Frankfurt Housing Development Program, as well as a small shopping center.

About 500 meters further on is the Stadtbahnstation Friedhof Westhausen, which bears the name of the nearby cemetery. The cemetery Westhausen is one of the largest cemeteries in Frankfurt and also houses a memorial to 4788 Italian military and civilians who died in World War II. The cemetery in turn is named after the 1929-31 built settlement Westhausen, which begins at the station and was also designed by Ernst May. Together with the next station Stephan-Heise-Straße, the settlement of more than a thousand apartments and the Liebig-Gymnasium will be developed. Both stations are very similar developed: They both have high platforms, each with a ground-level access and an underpass, which is combined at the cemetery Westhausen by ramps with the walkway of the Kollwitzstraße, the Ludwig-Landmann-Straße under.

In the further course of the route, the developed as a city highway A 66 is crossed and thus leave the district Praunheim, on whose boundary incidentally, the settlement Westhausen. Behind the motorway bridge is the station Hausener Weg. It lies at the intersection of the same street with the Ludwig-Landmann-Straße, opens up the adjacent residential areas of Hausen and Rödelheim and offers the possibility to change bus line 34. The bus stop was the first to be rebuilt according to barrier-free guidelines. The former ground-level platforms were replaced by elevated platforms and built traffic-light pedestrian crossings instead of underpasses. In contrast to the previous two stations, the underpass could no longer be connected to the platforms because the new ramps to the pedestrian crossing are located above. However, it remains passable as a connection between both sides of the street. In addition, there are still stairs to the Niddauferweg at the southeast end of the station. The Nidda is crossed directly after the station Hausener Weg.

The following station Fischstein had as last still low platforms. The conversion was completed at the end of May 2011. (→ see below); the station was moved some 100 m into the city.

Due to the Stadtbahn central workshop on the Heerstraße, the very varied traffic on this section of various vehicles - from light rail vehicles of all series to low-floor tram vehicles to work cars and old museum vehicles - is commonplace.

Hausen - Industriehof

The western end of the U6 (formerly U7) runs at ground level on the central strip of the street on high way through the district Hausen. Unlike the route to the army road, it was only inaugurated in 1986, the railway line and received its own railway body and elevated platforms. The former here running tram line 18, however, had some single-track route, but continued to the final stop Praunheim bridge, one kilometre to the north.

The terminus Hausen is located at the beginning of the Praunheimer highway at the Willi Brundert settlement. After a few 100 meters, the motorway A 66 is underpassed. The following stop Große Nelkenstraße opens up the old Hausener town center with the bread factory. This station is the only one to have two side platforms, which are not arranged opposite, but staggered: the train stops in the direction of travel before the junction of the Great Carnation Road.

After 1.2 kilometres, the track meets the U7 (formerly U6) and the street Am Industriehof and joins there together with the other route in the station Industriehof.

Bockenheim and Westend
The two western branch lines from Hausen and Praunheim converge in the Friedrich-Wilhelm-von-Steuben-Straße and reach the station Industriehof. The station is located on the eastern edge of the industrial park Industriehof in the amount of Insterburger Straße. South of the station close tram tracks in the direction of Breitenbachbrücke, which are only used for operating trips. Between these tracks, the subway goes via a ramp into the C-tunnel, the centerpiece of the C-line.

The C-tunnel crosses under the Main-Weser-Bahn and swings to the east in the old center of the district Bockenheim. The following station Kirchplatz is located below the Ginnheimer Landstraße and the adjoining blocks. The namesake of this station is the Protestant Jakobskirche, which is located at the northern end of the small square. In addition to ecclesiastical motifs can be found in the subway station and old pictures of the formerly independent city Bockenheim. Along the route, it is the first subterranean station in the postmodern style of the 1980s. After about 400 meters, the tunnel reaches the relatively narrow Leipziger Straße, where the two tunnel tubes run over each other. Under this Bockenheimer main shopping street is the same metro station, which is decorated with pictures of older subway systems such as Paris or London.

After another east swing the subway, again next to each other, reaches the former tower of the Frankfurt Landwehr, the Bockenheimer Warte, and thus the Frankfurt Westend. The subway station Bockenheimer Warte is located below the square of the same name and thus essentially opens up the Campus Bockenheim of the Johann Wolfgang Goethe University Frankfurt am Main. On the walls are photos from the everyday life of the university from the 80s. Via the western exit, the stop of tram line 16, which is located in front of the Bockenheimer Depot, can be reached. The station is since 2001 interchange station to the D-line. At the eastern end of the platform, a common B-level, designed as a rotunda, connects the entrances to both station structures. Immediately after the station is south of the tunnel tube a single-track connection curve to the D-line, which is used only for operating trips. It is the only underground connection between two ground routes in Frankfurt.

The continuation of the route leads below the Bockenheimer Landstraße and gets to the subway station Westend. The station of the architectural office A.C. Walter and Partner is characterized by floral elements and thus indicates the proximity to the palm garden. The area surrounding the station, the eponymous district Westend-Süd, but is also known for many office towers, such as the neighboring WestendDuo. At the end of the 1.3 km long Bockenheimer Landstraße, the route leaves the Westend.\

The Central section
Following this, the line reaches the Opernplatz in front of the Alte Oper, under which the A.C. Walter designed subway station Alte Oper is located. The station was built as the first Frankfurt tunnel station completely free of columns and attacks with its arched structures the neo-Renaissance architecture of the famous opera house. Immediately behind the station, the C-Tunnel merges with the S-Bahn City Tunnel, opened in 1978. Both routes now follow together the course of the known as Freßgass Great Bockenheimer road to the main train junction.

The Hauptwache station is a four-track railway station with the S-Bahn. The subway uses the two outer tracks, which are accessible via two side platforms. Across them is the station of the A-line, which can be changed here. The four-track tunnel under the Zeil joins the upper station. The Hauptwache is considered the central square of the city, many important main roads of the city start here.

The station Konstablerwache is also a four-track community station. However, here are two middle platforms arranged so that each can be changed at the same platform between subway and subway. At the Konstablerwache you can also change to the lines of the B-line and to the tram.

After the extension of the S-Bahn line to the south and a small "track apron" with siding, the three-track underground station Zoo in Ostend is reached. It is located under the Alfred-Brehm-Platz in front of the Gesellschaftshaus of the Frankfurt Zoo. In the immediate vicinity are also the Heinrich von Gagern Gymnasium and two hospitals. The platform hall, designed with numerous animal motifs, also extends over the B-level above. The northern one of the two platforms is a central platform on which each metro line runs in the city on its own track. Meanwhile, the southern platform is shared with just one track from all trains out of town.

Zoo - Ostbahnhof
While the western track branches have been used since the opening, the underground station Zoo was a common terminus of both lines for several years. Now the route branches here on the two eastern branch lines. The route to Ostbahnhof is at only about 750 meters, the shortest leg of the Frankfurt subway network. The two tunnels connect to the two outer tracks of Zoo subway station. The northern track coming from Ostbahnhof crosses the tunnel of the connecting line to Enkheim. Thus, a plan-free threading of the U6 trains on the trunk line is possible.

The route initially runs under the zoo grounds and then traverses a few bends in a right-hand bend and the Danziger Platz. He is the forecourt of the Ostbahnhof. At the southeastern end is the reception building and below it the subway station Ostbahnhof. Opened in 1999, this section is the latest addition to the C route and offers links to regional transport. The Ostbahnhof has no S-Bahn connection, but could be greatly upgraded by the planned Nordmainische S-Bahn and the new building of the European Central Bank on the grounds of the neighboring Grossmarkthalle in the future.

The outer walls of the underground station are decorated with large black and white photographs of the Main river and its bridges from the 19th to the 21st century. Decorated in the 19th century. The central platform has direct daylight through the glass roof of the central access building on Danziger Platz in front of the station building. The station was only accessible from there for eight years. In order to allow access from Hanauer Landstraße, located south of the Ostbahnhof, another entrance was built and the platform of the underground station extended. In addition, the tram line 11 received there an additional stop to allow a better transfer.

Zoo - Enkheim
After crossing the zoo, the subway line leads to the Rhönstraße and runs along their course of the road. From the intersection Waldschmidtstraße to the Frankfurter Alleenring, there is the subway station Habsburgerallee, which is named after this southeastern section of the Ringstraße. Like the following two stations, this one is very simple compared to the train stations in Bockenheim and the Westend. Dominant design elements are the octagonal pillars, according to which ceiling lights and floor coverings are directed. The color of the pillar and the motifs on the outer walls are the most striking differentiator in the three stations of the Ostend line. In the station Habsburgerallee the columns are green and on the wall there is a mosaic with donkeys by the artist Manfred Stumpf. The following underground station, Parliament Square, is located at the end of the Rhönstraße below a densely built-up square. Nearby is the Ostpark. The columns of the station are yellow and the wall motifs show black-and-white images of people communicating.

The last tunnel station of the Ostend line is the subway station Eissporthalle, which lies below the settlement Bornheimer slope planned by Ernst May and belongs already to the borough Bornheim. The settlement and the underground station are on the edge of the nearly 20-meter-high elevation of the same name. One entrance is on the Ratsweg, another leads directly from the slope to the fairground in front of the Eissporthalle Frankfurt. The station architecture in this case has blue columns and wintry photographs on wine-red walls.

The C-Tunnel ends between the ice rink and the stadium on Bornheimer Hang, and the tracks lead through a portal out of the Bornheimer Hang.

The section of the route passes through the Bergen area, and ends at Enkheim. The metro station at Habsburgerallee, which is named after this southeastern section of the Ringstraße, stretches to the Frankfurter Alleenring. Like the following two stations, this one is very simple compared to the train stations in Bockenheim and the Westend. Dominant design elements are the octagonal pillars, according to which ceiling lights and floor coverings are directed. The color of the pillar and the motifs on the exterior walls are the most striking distinguishing feature in the three stations of the Ostend Line. In the station Habsburgerallee the columns are green and on the wall there is a mosaic with donkeys by the artist Manfred Stumpf. The following underground station, Parliament Square, is located at the end of the Rhönstraße below a densely built-up square. Nearby is the Ostpark. The columns of the station are yellow and the wall motifs show black-and-white images of people communicating.

The eastern section of the U7 between Johanna-Tesch-Platz and Enkheim was converted from a former tram route in 1992. The lines 18 (Inheidener Str [today Ernst-May Square] - Zoo - Hanauer Highway - Eissporthalle - Enkheim) and 23 (Bornheim - Ratsweg - Eissporthalle - Enkheim) and on a stretch of which also the line 20 (Bornheim - Ratsweg - Eissporthalle - Bergen [until 1986], then line 12). For the subway stations were built with elevated platforms, enlarged curve radii and reduced crossings and equipped with traffic lights.

The route runs - immediately after leaving the tunnel (at the stadium on the Bornheimer slope) - north along the road Am Erlenbruch. At the junction of the Borsigallee, the track turns left to the north and continues on the median strip of this road. At the Seckbacher Station Gwinnerstraße branched off until 1992, the tram line 20 (last 12) to Bergen, which was shut down with the start of operation of the subway. The Seckbacher station Kruppstraße is located about 100 meters before the end of the eastern section of the A 66, which is of great importance for commuters from the eastern hinterland. For this reason, here is the large Seckbacher park-and-ride parking garage, which will encourage motorists to change to the subway. Until March 30, 1957 was still here at the former city limits (to the district of Hanau) the terminus Lahmeyerstraße tram 18, which was then extended on 31 March, until about today's terminus in Enkheim. The following station connects the shopping center Hessen-Center and opposite markets. The terminus Enkheim has been extensively redesigned, thus located between the two outer platforms a two-lane one-way bus lane with breakpoints for the change in or from further bus lines.

Gallery

Future Plans
Currently there are plans to extend the branch of the U6 from the Ostbahnhof along the Hanauer Landstraße to the Ratswegkreisel. Subsequently, the district of Fechenheim is to be reached on the current tram line in central position of the Hanauer highway. The planning is in some competition with the construction of the North-Main S-Bahn line to Hanau, because instead of the S-Bahn also an extension of the U6 to Hanau is possible. Since the city has decided in favor of the North-Main S-Bahn line, the construction is unlikely.

A short extension of the urban railway line in the district of Bergen-Enkheim along the street lamp to the mountain pool Bergen is currently not pursued. The reasons are the immediately adjacent nature reserve and the unclear development of the building area lamp.

At the western end of the U6, plans were made in the 1980s to extend the route to Steinbach or even further to Kronberg-Oberhöchstadt. To Steinbach this could be used for an originally planned city highway kept track including underpass under the A 5, a former gas station of the American Army on the highway could be converted into a park-and-ride place. The project was included in the General Transportation Plan in 2005, but there is no concrete timetable for the construction.

After the decision of the Roman coalition of 9 June 2017 to build a new district along the A5 motorway between Praunheim and Niederursel and Steinbach in the west, the extension of the U6 underground line over the current terminal Heerstraße out in the direction of Steinbach again discussed.

Also since 2005, a reactivation of the former tram line to Bergen in the general traffic plan is provided, which is to be supplemented by a short tunnel in the old town of Berger.

In early 2013, the Frankfurt Department of Transportation had a possible extension of the subway line 6 to Eschborn check. The Frankfurt Department of Transportation commissioned a correspondingly concrete study of the project, which concerned the extension of subway line 6, which currently ends at Heerstraße in Praunheim. A stop in the industrial park Helfmann-Park was considered possible. According to the mayor of Eschborn, this would "further enhance the Eschborn location". The Greens in the high Taunuskreis also advocated for an expansion of the U6 beyond Eschborn with stops in Steinbach and Kronberg, since the city of Oberursel in the high Taunuskreis long ago via the subway line 3 was connected to the Frankfurt subway network is. In March 2014, however, the city council of Frankfurt decided against the further expansion of the U6 in the Taunus, as the estimated costs of around 30 million euros were considered not "portable".

Many commuters who work on weekdays mainly from the direction of Frankfurt in the offices of the business park at Helfmann Park in Eschborn resident companies, now remains only the hope of the Regional Tangent West. The planning of the Regional Tangent West provides for a total of three new stops for the industrial estate in the southeast of Eschborn.

References

Frankfurt U-Bahn